Patch box or patchbox might refer to;

 Patch box (cosmetics), a box for storing artificial beauty marks
 Patch box (firearms), a storage compartment on muzzleloader guns
 Tinderbox, or patch box, used to store flint and tinder to kindle a fire